Tramway to Malvarrosa is a 1996 Spanish coming-of-age drama film directed by José Luis García Sánchez and written by Rafael Azcona based on the 1994 novel by Manuel Vicent. It stars Liberto Rabal.

Plot 
Starting in 1957, the plot tracks the coming-of-age story and sexual awakening of Manuel, a small-town boy who moves to the provincial capital, Valencia, to study a degree in law.

Cast

Production 
An adaptation of the novel Tranvía a la Malvarrosa by Manuel Vicent, the screenplay was penned by Rafael Azcona. The film was produced by Andrés Vicente Gómez's Lola Films alongside Sogetel, with participation of Canal+, and Sogepaq. In addition to the city of Valencia, shooting took place across locations in the wider Valencia region, including the provinces of Valencia (El Saler, Alzira, Nazaret,  Sueca, Guadassuar, L'Alcúdia and Alboraia), Alicante (Pego) and Castellón (Les Alqueries and Xodos).

Release 
The film screened at the Mar del Plata International Film Festival in November 1996. It was pre-screened in Valencia on 21 March 1997. Distributed by Columbia Tri-Star Films de España, the film was theatrically released in Spain on 4 April 1997.

Reception 
Ken Eisner of Variety deemed the film to be "a wonderfully evocative coming-of-age story".

Accolades 

|-
| rowspan = "4" align = "center" | 1997 || rowspan = "4" | 11th Goya Awards || Best Adapted Screenplay || José Luis García Sánchez, Rafael Azcona ||  || rowspan = "4" | 
|-
| Best Cinematography || José Luis Alcaine || 
|-
| Best New Actor || Liberto Rabal || 
|-
| Best Art Direction || Pierre-Louis Thévenet || 
|}

See also 
 List of Spanish films of 1997

References 

Spanish coming-of-age drama films
Films set in Valencia
1996 drama films
1990s coming-of-age drama films
Films shot in Valencia
Films shot in the province of Valencia
Films shot in the province of Alicante
LolaFilms films
Films set in 1957
Films based on Spanish novels
1990s Spanish films